Maxime Michel (born 22 April 1990) is a French badminton player. He won 2007-2008 and 2008-2009 seasons of French National Junior Badminton Championships in boys' singles and boys' doubles event.

Achievements

BWF International Challenge/Series 
Men's Singles

  BWF International Challenge tournament
  BWF International Series tournament
  BWF Future Series tournament

References

External links 
 

1990 births
Living people
French male badminton players